The Budeasa is a right tributary of the Râul Doamnei in Romania. It flows into the Râul Doamnei in Mărăcineni.

References

Rivers of Romania
Rivers of Argeș County